Al-Darbasiyah Subdistrict is a subdistrict of Ras al-Ayn District in northern al-Hasakah Governorate, northeastern Syria. The administrative centre is the city of al-Darbasiyah.

At the 2004 census, the subdistrict had a population of 55,614.

Cities, towns and villages

References 

Ras al-Ayn District
al-Darbasiyah